Mauro Antonio Tesi (January 15, 1730 – July 18, 1766), or, as he is sometimes called, after the name given him by his patron and admirer, Francesco Algarotti, "Il Maurino", was an Italian painter of the late-Baroque period, active mainly in Bologna. He is also considered an early proponent of the Neo-classical style.

Biography
He was born in Montalbano near Modena. 
He was largely self-taught and worked as both a decorative  and an architectural painter in churches and both public and private buildings in Bologna and Florence. In 1764, he completed the nave ceiling frescoes for the small church of San Leone, Pistoia. He travelled with and illustrated the works of his compagnon Algarotti and designed the funeral monument on the Campo Santo in Pisa. One of his pupils was Valentino Baldi. He died in Bologna two years after Algarotti, it is said also by tuberculosis.

Works

Two of his paintings can be seen in the Residenzschloss Ludwigsburg.

Sources

References

1730 births
1766 deaths
Artists from the Province of Modena
18th-century Italian painters
Italian male painters
Italian Baroque painters
18th-century Italian male artists